Arkatovo is a rural locality (a village) in Rostilovskoye Rural Settlement, Gryazovetsky District, Vologda Oblast, Russia. The population was 10 as of 2002.

Geography 
Arkatovo is located 44 km south of Gryazovets (the district's administrative centre) by road. Chistopyanovo is the nearest rural locality.

References 

Rural localities in Gryazovetsky District